Molly Tarlov (born September 12, 1992) is an American actress. She played the role of Sadie Saxton on MTV's TV series Awkward.

Early life 
Tarlov was born and raised in Manhattan, in New York City, to film producer and wine maker Mark Tarlov and mother Judy Roberts. She is the younger of two daughters. On her mother's side, both of her grandparents were Jewish immigrants, her grandfather from Russia, and her grandmother escaping Europe on the last boat from France prior to WWII.

As a child, Tarlov appeared in the musical "Bye Bye Birdie" at the Little Red School House. She attended the arts camp, Interlochen Center for the Arts and a NYU summer program in Paris. Tarlov graduated from Bennington College with a B.A. in Theatre Arts in 2008.

After college, Tarlov attended the Atlantic Theater Company and LAByrinth Theater Company, where she wrote as well as acted in the LAByrinth Master Class.

Career

Television 
Tarlov's television debut was a bit part on iCarly in 2009. In 2010, she appeared in the role of Caitlin on the ABC Family series Huge, which was written and created by My So-Called Life'''s Winnie Holzman and her daughter Savannah Dooley.

Tarlov's breakthrough role was as mean girl Sadie Saxton in the MTV original series, Awkward, which debuted in 2011. Tarlov's character was notable for her intense dislike of the main character, Jenna, played by Ashley Rickards, and for her complex struggles with weight and her own neuroses and insecurities. Sadie was also noteworthy for nasty putdowns that were followed by her signature, "You're Welcome!" on topics from bulimia, being gay, and appropriate behavior. The character inspired Twitter feeds and GIFs.

 Film 
In 1999, Tarlov had a role in the feature film, Simply Irresistible, which was directed by her father.

In 2014, Tarlov starred in the movie G.B.F., a teen comedy written by George Northy and directed by Darren Stein (Jawbreaker).

 Other work 
In August 2012, Tarlov recorded an It Gets Better Project video clip.

In May 2015, Tarlov, along with her co-stars from Awkward and other MTV shows did a stylized promo for the Scream where they were all shown bloodied and killed. Tarlov was skewered by a fire poker against a wall behind Katie Stevens from Faking It.''

In July 2015, Tarlov co-starred in Eden xo's music video for the single "The Weekend." The video also featured Bonnie McKee and Ricky Dillon.

Personal life 
On June 23, 2015, Tarlov revealed that she was engaged to trailer editor and former drummer Alexander Noyes, who was in the bands Honor Society and Jonas Brothers. They were married on March 4, 2017. Tarlov and Noyes welcomed their first son in August, 2020.

Tarlov's sister, Jessica Tarlov, is a Democratic strategist who is a political commentator and is also a rotating co-host of The Five.

Filmography

Film

Television

Music videos

References

External links
 

Jessica Tarlov

1992 births
Living people
American child actresses
American film actresses
American television actresses
Actresses from New York City
People from Manhattan
21st-century American actresses
American people of Russian-Jewish descent
American people of French-Jewish descent
Jewish American actresses